Tuningen is a Gemeinde (municipality) located in the Schwarzwald-Baar district in the middle of Baden-Württemberg, Germany.

The municipality belongs to the administrative authority (Verwaltungsgemeinschaft) of Villingen-Schwenningen.

Geography
Tuningen is located at the east border of the Black Forest about 14 km south-east of the district town Villingen-Schwenningen, 6 km east of Bad Dürrheim and 5 km south-west of Trossingen.

History
The first explicit reference to Tuningen dates to 797, in a deed of donation by the cloister St. Gallen.

Twin towns
 Camogli, Italy, since 1998

References

External links
 Gemeinde Tuningen (in German)
 Search machine Tuningen | information and pictures (in German)

Schwarzwald-Baar-Kreis